Antología (English Anthology) is the 3rd compilation album by Mexican pop singer Mijares.

Track listing
Tracks:
 Bella 	
 Poco A Poco	
 Soñador	
 No Se Murió El Amor	
 Para Amarnos Más 	
 Soldado Del Amor	
 Uno Entre Mil	
 Baño De Mujeres	
 El Rey De La Noche 	
 Amor Y Rock And Roll	
 Encadenado	
 Corazón Salvaje	
 Me Acordaré De Ti	
 El Amor No Tiene Fronteras
 Como Duele Perder 	
 No Hace Falta	
 Cuatro Veces Amor (Live)	
 Alfonsina Y El Ma	
 Un Montón De Verano	
 Persona A Persona

Manuel Mijares compilation albums
2002 compilation albums